12 teams took part in the league with FC Dynamo Moscow winning the championship.

League standings

Results

Top scorers
15 goals
 Eduard Streltsov (Torpedo Moscow)

13 goals
 Nikolai Parshin (Spartak Moscow)

12 goals
 Vladimir Ilyin (Dynamo Moscow)
 Sergei Salnikov (Spartak Moscow)

10 goals
 Mykhaylo Koman (Dynamo Kiev)

9 goals
 Genrikh Fedosov (Dynamo Moscow)
 Avtandil Gogoberidze (Dinamo Tbilisi)
 Viktor Razumovsky (Lokomotiv Moscow)

8 goals
 Yuri Belyayev (CDSA Moscow)
 Aleksei Kolobov (Trudovyye Rezervy Leningrad)
 Alakbar Mammadov (Dynamo Moscow)
 Viktor Terentyev (Dinamo Kiev)
 Valentin Yemyshev (CDSA Moscow)

References

 Soviet Union - List of final tables (RSSSF)

1955
1
Soviet
Soviet